Aristolochia schlechteri, synonym Pararistolochia schlechteri, is a liana endemic to Papua New Guinea. It was first described by Carl Lauterbach in 1905. Although its distribution is supposedly restricted to the Northern Province, there have been two rare accounts of occurrences in the Madang and East Sepik Provinces.

References 

schlechteri
Flora of Papua New Guinea
Vines